Vladimir Artemev (born 1960) is a retired Belarusian artistic gymnast who competed for the Soviet Union. He was a member of the Soviet national team from 1977 through 1987  and was the Soviet national all-around champion in 1982 and 1984.  He was unable to compete at the 1984 Summer Olympics due to the Soviet boycott.

He is the father and coach of American gymnast Alexander Artemev. They moved to the United States in 1994 and became US citizens in 2002.

References

1960 births
Living people
Gymnasts from Minsk
Soviet male artistic gymnasts
Belarusian emigrants to the United States